The American College of Sofia (ACS) is a school in Bulgaria, located in the capital city of Sofia.

The college was founded in 1860 and is regarded as the oldest American educational institution outside the United States. American pedagogical methods are used and the primary language of instruction is English.

History 
Founded in 1860 in the then-Ottoman Empire, it was initially a boys' school in Plovdiv established by American missionaries of the Congregational Church. By co-operating with a girls' school in Stara Zagora founded by the same people, the American College was established and moved to Samokov in 1871. They were the first boarding schools in the country. The teachers were mostly Americans and many of the school's Bulgarian students went on to become ministers and important social figures.

As the Mission Boards decided to close the schools at Samokov and leave Bulgaria, a decision met with protests and discontent among Bulgarian alumni and American donors alike, the schools were transferred to another organization, Sofia American Schools, Inc., merged and moved to Sofia in 1926. The construction of a campus in Simeonovo began the same year to start accommodating 119 girls in 1928, 63 boys in 1929, as well as the remaining 130 a year later.

With Bulgaria initially being on the side of the Axis Powers during World War II, many of the teachers left and only a handful had remained when Bulgaria declared war on the United States in December 1941. They continued to operate the college until ousted by the pro-Axis authorities in the autumn of 1942. As the war ended and Bulgaria became a communist state, the American College's entire property was confiscated in 1947 and the campus was used as the office of the Bulgarian State Police during the times of socialism.

The college was reopened in September 1992, enrolling 50 boys and 50 girls from over 3,000 that signed up to take the specified test. Much of the old campus and many of the pre-World War II American College buildings have since then been given back to the college, yet parts of the campus are still occupied by the Police Academy. , the American College of Sofia has 606 Bulgarian and 33 foreign students and has enrolled over a thousand, with 848 graduating. Since June 2005, the college also offers the IB Diploma Programme, only for the international students. The former president of the American College of Sofia is Thomas Cangiano, former Cleve Housemaster and History Master at the Lawrenceville School. The current president is Dr. Richard T. Ewing Jr. The first class of the reopened school celebrated their 10-year reunion in June 2007.

Campus 
The school operates in eight recently renovated classical buildings, including the new America for Bulgaria Campus Center, all located on 52 park-like acres. It includes seven academic buildings, 62 classrooms, four computer labs, three science labs, a Student Computer Innovation and Fabrication Institute (SCIFI), Audio-Video Studio, a 435-seat theater, a 180-seat concert hall, a 28-bed student dormitory, a large 1276-square-meter multi-purpose gymnasium, several small indoor sports facilities that include a dance studio, and a fitness center, as well as outdoor basketball courts and playing fields.

Curriculum 
The American College of Sofia integrates the values and best practices of American pedagogy with the rich educational traditions of Bulgaria and Europe. ACS has 5 academic grades: 8th or “prep” grade and the 4 high school grades, 9th-12th.

IB Program 
At ACS, the IB program is available only to international students. International members receive an IB diploma, as well as the American High School Diploma.

American High School Diploma 
All students at ACS, receive an American High School Diploma. Bulgarian students at ACS also earn a Bulgarian Diploma.

Bulgarian Diploma 
Bulgarian students at ACS receive a Bulgarian Diploma and an American High School Diploma.

Innovative Schools Status 
In 2017 the Bulgarian Ministry of Education granted ACS with a "innovative school" status.

References

External links 

 ACS Official website

Educational institutions established in 1860
International Baccalaureate schools in Bulgaria
American international schools in Bulgaria
1860 establishments in the Ottoman Empire
International schools in Sofia